Small Pieces Loosely Joined: A Unified Theory of the Web is a book by David Weinberger published by Perseus Publishing in 2002. The book's central premise is that the World Wide Web has significantly altered humanity's understanding or perception of the concepts of space, matter, time, perfection, public, knowledge, and morality, each of which comprises the title of a chapter in the book. The web, Weinberger writes, "is enabling us to rediscover what we've always known about being human: we are connected creatures in a connected world about which we care passionately."

See also

Internet and Technology Law Desk Reference

External links
 Website for Small Pieces

2002 non-fiction books
Philosophy books
Books about the Internet